Technetium hexafluoride or technetium(VI) fluoride (TcF6) is a yellow inorganic compound with a low melting point. It was first identified in 1961. In this compound, technetium has an oxidation state of +6, the highest oxidation state found in the technetium halides. In this respect, technetium differs from rhenium, which forms a heptafluoride, ReF7. Technetium hexafluoride occurs as an impurity in uranium hexafluoride, as technetium is a fission product of uranium (spontaneous fission in natural uranium, possible contamination from induced fission inside the reactor in reprocessed uranium). The fact that the boiling point of the hexafluorides of uranium and technetium are very close to each other presents a problem in using fluoride volatility in nuclear reprocessing.

Preparation 
Technetium hexafluoride is prepared by heating technetium metal with an excess of F2 at 400 °C.

Tc + 3  →

Description 
Technetium hexafluoride is a golden-yellow solid at room temperature. Its melting point is 37.4 °C and its boiling point is 55.3 °C.

Technetium hexafluoride undergoes a solid phase transition at −4.54 °C. Above this temperature (measured at 10 °C), the solid structure is cubic. Lattice parameters are a = 6.16 Å. There are two formula units (in this case, discrete molecules) per unit cell, giving a density of 3.02 g·cm−3. Below this temperature (measured at −19 °C), the solid structure is orthorhombic space group Pnma.  Lattice parameters are a = 9.55 Å, b = 8.74 Å, and c = 5.02 Å.  There are four formula units (in this case, discrete molecules) per unit cell, giving a density of 3.38 g·cm−3. At −140 °C, the solid structure is still orthothombic, but the lattice parameters are now a = 9.360 Å, b = 8.517 Å, and c = 4.934 Å, giving a density of 3.58 g·cm−3.

The TcF6 molecule itself (the form important for the liquid or gas phase) has octahedral molecular geometry, which has point group (Oh). The Tc–F bond length is 1.812 Å. Its magnetic moment has been measured to be 0.45 μB.

Properties

Physical 
TcF6 is octahedral, as shown by infrared and Raman spectra. Its low-temperature orthorhombic form converts to the higher symmetry body-centred cubic form at room temperature, like other metal hexafluorides such as RhF6 and OsF6. Preliminary measurements of magnetic moment yield a value of 0.45 µB, which is lower than expected for a d1 octahedral compound.

Chemical 
TcF6 reacts with alkaline chlorides in iodine pentafluoride (IF5) solution to form hexafluorotechnetates. TcF6  disproportionates on hydrolysis with aqueous NaOH to form a black precipitate of TcO2. In hydrogen fluoride solution, TcF6 reacts with hydrazinium fluoride to yield N2H6TcF6 or N2H6(TcF6)2.

References 

Technetium compounds
Hexafluorides
Octahedral compounds